Mustapha Ussif (born 16 August 1979) is a Ghanaian politician. He is a member of the New Patriotic Party and a member of the 8th parliament of the 4th Republic of Ghana representing the Yagaba-Kubori Constituency in the North East Region of Ghana. On 21 January 2021, he was nominated by Nana Akufo-Addo to serve as Minister of Youth and Sports.

Early life and education
Ussif was born on 16 August 1979. He hails from Tantaala in the Northern Region of Ghana. He studied at Bagabaga Teacher Training College and Anglia Ruskin University where he obtained his Bachelor of Arts degree in International Business and Management in 2010. He continued at the University of Gloucestershire where he graduated in 2011 with a master's degree in Finance and Investment.

Career
Ussif worked as an Investment Analyst at Ray and Associates, UK in 2010. That same year, he joined Action Aid UK where he worked as a Freelance Consultant.

Politics

Member of Parliament 
Ussif entered parliament on 7 January 2013 on the ticket of the New Patriotic Party after defeating the incumbent member of parliament Abdul-Rauf Tanko Ibrahim. He represented the Yagaba-Kubori Constituency from 2013 to 2017 in the 6th parliament but subsequently lost in his bid to be reelected into the 7th parliament to his previous opponent Abdul-Rauf Tanko Ibrahim of the National Democratic Congress during the 2016 Ghanaian general election. In that 6th parliament, he served on the Mines and Energy Committee, and the Standing Orders Committee.

He stood for the NPP's parliamentary primaries unopposed and was declared the person to represent the party in the 2020 December elections. He beat the incumbent member of parliament Abdul-Rauf Tanko Ibrahim who he had faced on two occasions in the past elections. He won with 18,153 votes representing 64.01% whilst his opponent had 9,393 votes representing 33.14%

Executive Director of NSS 
In 2017, He was appointed to serve as the executive director of the National Service Scheme by president, Nana Akufo-Addo during the first term of his government.

Minister of Youth and Sports 
After winning back the Yagaba-Kubori Constituency seat in 2020, Ussif was nominated on 21 January 2021 by President Nana Akufo-Addo to serve as Minister of Youth and Sports during his second term. After going through vetting in Parliament of Ghana and passing he was sworn into office on 5 March 2021 along with 27 other minister-designates at the Jubilee House, Accra.

Personal life
Ussif is married with two children. He identifies as a Muslim.

References

Ghanaian MPs 2013–2017
1979 births
Living people
Ghanaian Muslims
Alumni of Anglia Ruskin University
Alumni of the University of Gloucestershire
Ghanaian MPs 2021–2025
New Patriotic Party politicians